kJ/kg may refer to:
 kilojoules per kilogram
 The SI derived units of specific energy 
 Specific Internal energy
 Specific kinetic energy
 Heat of fusion
 Heat of combustion